Carolina Stanley (born November 22, 1975 in Buenos Aires) is an Argentine lawyer and politician. From 2011 to 2015, she worked as the minister of social development of the City of Buenos Aires until then-president Mauricio Macri appointed her as Minister of Social Development of the Argentine Nation, a post that she held until Macri left the Casa Rosada in 2019.

Personal life 
Carolina Stanley was born in Buenos Aires in 1975 to former Citibank executive Guillermo Stanley. She attended the bilingual St. Catherine School before enrolling in the University of Buenos Aires to study law. She graduated in 5 years with an average of 9.45. She is married to Argentine politician and infobae columnist Federico Salvai [es], who had served as the head of cabinet in Mauricio Macri and María Eugenia Vidal's Buenos Aires city government. They have two children.

Political career 
In 1998, Carolina Stanley made her political debut in the Argentine Ministry of Foreign Affairs and Worship, working as a consultant for North American and Hemispheric Affairs Directorate (Spanish: Dirección de América del Norte y Asuntos Hemisféricos). From 2000 to 2003, she worked as a social policy advisor for Congresswoman Maria Laura Leguizamon. She joined the center-right Republican Proposal party (abbrev. PRO) in 2003 and served as the executive director for the think tank Sophia Group (Spanish: Grupo Sophia) from 2004 to 2007, along with Argentine economist Horacio Rodríguez Larreta. 

In 2007, newly elected Buenos Aires mayor Mauricio Macri, who would later become the President of Argentina, appointed Stanley as the head of the city's General Directorate for Strengthening Civil Society (Spanish: Dirección General de Fortalecimiento de la Sociedad Civil). Stanley was elected to the Buenos Aires City Legislature in 2009, representing the Republican Proposal party. She became the city's Minister of Social Development in 2011, when María Eugenia Vidal, who was holding the position until then, became the Deputy Mayor.

Stanley served on the social policy team led by economist Emilio Basavilbaso [es], who played an important role in presidential candidate Mauricio Macri's campaign, along with Esteban Bullrich, Jorge Lemus, and Eduardo Amadeo [es]. The same year, Macri won the presidential elections and appointed Stanley as the Minister of Social Development of the Nation.

References 

1975 births
Argentine people of Irish descent
Living people
Politicians from Buenos Aires
Republican Proposal politicians
21st-century Argentine politicians
21st-century Argentine women politicians
Argentine ministers of health
Women government ministers of Argentina